Line S1 of the Nanjing Metro, is a suburban metro rail line serving the southern suburbs of Nanjing, running from  to . It connects Nanjing South railway station with Nanjing Lukou International Airport. The line started construction on December 27, 2011, and was opened on July 1, 2014. In September 2011 a contract for 15 6 car Type B metro trains was given to CSR Corporation Limited, with the first train arriving in August 2013.

Line S1 also serves as the first stage of the Nanjing–Gaochun intercity railway, with Line S9 serving as the second stage.

Opening timeline

Station list

References

External links 
Line S1 on the official Nanjing Metro website (includes route map) 

Nanjing Metro lines
Railway lines opened in 2014
Airport rail links in China